Big Brother 2013, also known as Big Brother 14 and Big Brother: Secrets and Lies, was the fourteenth series of the British reality television series Big Brother. It launched on 13 June 2013 on Channel 5 and 5*, and lasted for 68 days, ending on 19 August 2013. It was part of a new two-year contract with Endemol, which secured the show until 2014. It was the third regular series to air on Channel 5 and the seventh series of Big Brother to air on the channel since they acquired the show. The series was won by 23-year-old Sam Evans from Llanelli. He won the full £100,000 prize fund, making him the first winner since 2010 to do so.

Eight housemates entered on launch night, including a set of twins becoming one housemate; with another six, including a mother and daughter, entering the house the following night. Unbeknownst to the housemates, an actor controlled by the viewers, Michael Dylan - otherwise known as "The People's Puppet" - entered the house on launch night, and this was revealed to them upon his departure on Day 9. On Day 33, after a confrontation between housemates Daley Ojuederie and Hazel O'Sullivan, Daley became the first housemate to be ejected from the Big Brother House since Big Brother moved to Channel 5. For the first time in regular Big Brother history, no new housemates entered the house following the two launch nights.

The fourteenth series saw the return of viewers voting to evict, rather than voting to save alike the two previous series. This way of voting had not been used since Ultimate Big Brother.

This was the first series of Big Brother to be presented by Big Brother's Bit on the Side co-host Emma Willis and the first presenter change since Brian Dowling took over from Davina McCall in 2011. Willis continued to host Bit on the Side along with Rylan Clark and AJ Odudu, who replaced Jamie East and Alice Levine.

This is the most watched Channel 5 series of Big Brother UK averaging 1.9 million.

Production

Auditions

On 11 December 2012, it was revealed that Big Brother producers had axed all open auditions for Big Brother 14, making this the first series since Big Brother 5 in 2004 to see housemates chosen only from online applications. In order to become a housemate, potential housemates had to record a 90-second video and fill out an online application form.

If bosses liked what they saw, the chosen few would be invited to 'callbacks', which took place in January and February 2013 in London and Manchester. A source said, "With only a few minutes to impress producers, only the best will get into the show this year. There won't be any second chances or opportunities to try again at another open audition. They have just one shot." However, from 13–15 December, "Talent Spotters" from Big Brother visited bars in Blackpool to find new housemates; they also visited Huddersfield on 14 December 2012.

Presenters

On 13 March 2013, it was reported that Brian Dowling had been removed from presenting Big Brother and that Emma Willis would be taking over. These rumours were confirmed on 2 April. It was also speculated that Rylan Clark would be taking over the role of hosting Big Brother's Bit on the Side after previously winning Celebrity Big Brother 11 in January 2013.

On 17 April, Alice Levine and Jamie East both announced via Twitter that they had left spin-off show Big Brother's Bit on the Side after six series. Clark initially denied he would be hosting the show, but Channel 5 officially confirmed on 14 May that Clark and AJ Odudu would join Willis as presenters of Big Brother's Bit on the Side; and that Willis would continue her Bit on the Side role in addition to taking over as host of the main show. Plus, Big Brother's Bit on the Psych aired on Saturday nights, with Odudu as the sole presenter, and included guests and psychologists examining housemates' behaviour during the week. Clark also hosted a Sunday lunchtime edition of Bit on the Side, called Rylan's Supersized Celebrity Sunday.

Format
The fourteenth series of Big Brother introduced several changes to the format. One of the changes implemented in the fourteenth series was the return of "Vote to Evict". This way of voting had not been used since Ultimate Big Brother. Another change was Big Brother sometimes revealing the number of nominations each nominee received to the housemates, and it also saw the three or more housemates with the most nominations facing the public vote each week, with the nominated housemate who had the fewest votes to evict after lines had been frozen usually being saved during a live segment in the Wednesday highlights show. Voting lines then reopened. During the live eviction show, for the first time, nominated housemates were given thirty seconds to broadcast a 'plea' explaining why they think they should stay in the house.

Eye logo

An alternate eye logo was officially unveiled on 24 May 2013. The dark eye sported a pupil built entirely of television screens, whilst the rest of the eye consisted of life-sized recycled doors, furniture and white fluorescent lights to coincide with the theme of the series, a stark contrast from the bright colours of the Big Brother 13 eye. The "official" eye logo, which features it on a white background with colour, was revealed on 4 June. Channel 5 admitted that they deliberately "fooled" fans by concealing the eye as a tie-in to the 'Secrets and Lies' theme of the series.

House
On 5 May 2013, it was reported that the House had been "completely redesigned". On 23 May 2013, it was confirmed that the house would be 'Eco' in design. The series was expected to show the objective of self-sufficiency and recycling throughout and this was represented throughout the house. Inside the house, as housemates entered, they were greeted by a huge wall containing recycled life-sized doors. Behind one of the doors was the Diary Room; a housemate could call to talk to Big Brother in this room from the bottom of the stairs. Inside the Diary Room was a metallic based chair, layered in slim red padding. Outside of the Diary Room, there was a sweeping staircase leading down to an eco-living room with producers desperate to make the housemates experience 'hell in a hell house'. The living room contained different coloured sofas and chairs and a plasma television. Beside the living room, there was a circular style kitchen for housemates to use. The housemates could store their food items and utensils obtained from the adjacent store room in a purpose-built cow. There was a round table for housemates to sit at and eat together at. Beside the living room, there was a small toilet, and the bedroom. The bedroom was colourful in design this year, and introduced a bike which powered the hair dryers and hair straighteners when active. Both the bedroom and the living area led out into the garden. This series, the garden had a barred prison for any housemates that misbehaved, as well as a treehouse for housemates to get cosy in and it included the returning vegetable patch which was last seen in Big Brother 4. Housemates had to shower outside; with one housemate having to spin a wheel that powered the only shower. The traditional mangle also made its return to the house. House pictures were officially unveiled in the Daily Star on 10 June 2013.

The Safe House
On 19 June 2013 episode of Big Brother's Bit on the Side, rumours arose of a secret bedroom visible in this year's house plan. It had an en suite with baths, a shower and a toilet. On 3 July 2013, it was confirmed that a duo of fake evicted housemates would re-enter a Big Brother House next door called the Safe House. These housemates lived under a lap of luxury and gained immunity from nominations for a whole week. They were allowed to spy on the other housemates with a television and headphones. This is similar to Big Brother 5 and Ultimate Big Brothers bedsit, Big Brother 12s crypt and Celebrity Big Brother 11s luxury basement.

Live feed
Channel 5 announced on 14 May 2013 that the live feed would be partly reinstated, for two hours per day. Big Brother: Live from the House aired each night from 7–9pm on 5* (except Sundays where only one hour was broadcast from 8–9pm). Live feed was also broadcast on Channel 5 after every live eviction show for 30 minutes, after Big Brother's Bit on the Side, to show how the housemates coped with the results of the weekly eviction. On 26 June 2013, Channel 5 announced that it would axe the nightly live feed on 5*, however, in effect after 30 June. The live feed later made a return online via channel5.com between midnight (11:30pm on Sundays) and 2am daily from 12 July 2013.

Teasers
On 17 May 2013, a six-second teaser aired on Channel 5 ahead of the new series asking viewers to guess "#whatsthesecret". On 19 May, a second teaser aired which featured two doors that were pink and blue, as well as asking viewers to guess "#whatsthesecret". These teasers led to speculation that the new series could be based on a similar premise to Secret Story, a spin-off format of Big Brother that has been successful worldwide. On 13 June 2013, prior to the launch, Channel 5 published 15 housemate teasers. This led to rumours that there would be sixteen housemates, as one teaser mentioned twin housemates. It was even rumored that a "viewers' puppet" controlled by viewers votes would enter the house.

Sponsorship
The series sponsor was casino website and TV programme (that airs nightly on Channel 5) SuperCasino.
The series also featured Product Placement from Very.co.uk who supplied products for the house, along with Aquafresh, Weetabix, L'Oréal, Zeo and Levi Roots (on Day 59). Housemates ordered their shopping from online grocery business Ocado, using an iPad, as part of another product placement agreement.

Housemates 

On Day 1, eight housemates entered the house. The first two housemates, Jack and Joe, entered as a joint housemate. A further six housemates entered on Day 2, including a mother and daughter duo (Charlie & Jackie) competing as two individual housemates.

Dan Neal had appeared in the first series of former reality show Lads' Army in 2002.

The People's Puppet
29-year-old Michael Dylan from Cork entered the house as "The People's Puppet" on Day 1, and was hired by Big Brother as a housemate that was controlled by the viewers. Unlike every other housemate, Michael did not have genuine housemate status and is referred to as a non-housemate or a houseguest but this was unknown to the housemates. Michael's true identity as "The People's Puppet" was revealed on Day 9, and he then left the house.

Weekly summary

Nominations table

Notes

: The public decided on "The People's Puppet" Michael's behalf on who would face the first public vote, rather than nominations taking place as normal. The three housemates with the most votes were Gina, Dexter and Sallie and these were as a result Michael's three nominations. The phone lines froze on Day 7, and Michael was told by Big Brother that Dexter had the fewest votes and he therefore saved him from eviction. Voting then resumed for Gina and Sallie. After Sallie's eviction, it was revealed to the housemates that Michael was "The People's Puppet", and he then left the house.
: The public vote to evict was frozen on Day 14 and Gina was saved, having received the fewest votes. Voting then resumed for Dexter and Jemima.
: On Day 19, housemates had to nominate face-to-face, live on Channel 5. As punishment for discussing nominations earlier that day, Dexter was banned from nominating. Had Dexter been allowed to nominate, he would have nominated Wolfy and Jackie, meaning Dexter, Gina and Wolfy would have faced the public vote. This week was a "fake double eviction", in which the public voted for who they wanted to move into the Safe House, where the chosen pair would secretly live in luxury watching their fellow housemates' every move. The pairs were pre-selected by their nominations tally so either Dan and Wolfy (tied third) or Dexter and Gina (first and second) were "fake evicted". On Day 23, the two housemates chosen to enter the Safe House were Gina and Dexter.
: Whilst Dexter and Gina were living in the Safe House, they could not nominate and could not be nominated by their fellow housemates, assuming them to be evicted and also unaware that Dexter and Gina were able to see their nominations. In a twist, Big Brother gave Dexter and Gina the opportunity to save one of the four nominees (who would live alongside them in luxury) and replace them with another housemate. Dexter and Gina chose to save Charlie and replaced her with Jackie.
: On Day 30, after Wolfy's eviction, the lines opened for two housemates to move into the Safe House, in which they would be immune from the next eviction. The pairs were pre-selected so either Charlie and Dexter, Dan and Gina, Sam and Sophie, Jack and Joe, Daley and Hazel or Callum and Jackie would move into the Safe House. On Day 31, the two housemates chosen to move into the Safe House were Daley and Hazel, however, Daley was ejected from the house on Day 33. Due to Daley's ejection, a planned nominations twist was cancelled and normal nominations took place. As she was living in the Safe House, Hazel could nominate but could not be nominated by her fellow housemates.
: There were no nominations in Week 6. Unbeknownst to the housemates, the housemates living in the Safe House would automatically face the public vote. Housemates chose Sam & Sophie to live in the Safe House, who were subsequently told that they could choose another housemate to live alongside them. On Day 40, Big Brother lied to the housemates, telling them that those not living in the Safe House were up for eviction. Sam & Sophie chose Dan to live in the Safe House, meaning he also faced the public vote this week.
: As well as finding out they were nominated, Callum, Dexter, Hazel and Jack & Joe were shown who nominated them.
: Rather than the housemates nominating this week, housemates' friends and family nominated on their behalf.
: On Day 60, housemates were tasked with unanimously choosing one person to receive a free pass to the final. However, they failed to reach a consensus, and thus lost the pass. Housemates nominated face-to-face for the second time in a live broadcast on Day 61. On Day 63, following the Prize Fund Lie, Dexter became immune and had to choose one housemate to replace him to face the public vote. He chose Sophie.
: The public were voting for the housemate they wanted to see win Big Brother.

Ratings and reception

Television ratings
Official ratings were taken from BARB and include Channel 5 +1.

Controversy and criticism

More than 150 people complained to television watchdog Ofcom after Big Brother issued Jemima Slade a formal warning on Day 4 over her apparent offensive comments towards Gina Rio. Gina took offence to Jemima's comments about her disliking of dating black men and she deemed her to be racist.

On Day 33, Daley became the first housemate to be ejected from the Big Brother House since the show moved to Channel 5. The ejection was due to Daley's threatening behaviour towards Hazel. Channel 5 later chose to broadcast the footage that caused the ejection which showed Daley slap Hazel's behind, clasp her by her throat and pin her down against her bed. This resulted in Ofcom receiving a total of 60 complaints and it was later confirmed that they had launched an investigation. Daley was later banned from appearing on the show's final.

Over 200 complaints were received by Ofcom later on in the series pertaining to an argument which Gina had with Hazel. During the heated argument, Gina described Hazel as a 'skank' and a 'whore', continuously referring back to Hazel's relationship with Daley. Some viewers deemed Gina's actions as a form of bullying.

References

External links
 Official website
 Official Big Brother Page
 

2013 British television seasons
14
Channel 5 (British TV channel) reality television shows